Daniel Webster Mills (February 25, 1838 – December 16, 1904) was a U.S. Representative from Illinois.

Born near Waynesville, Ohio, Mills attended the common schools of Rayesville and the Waynesville High School.
He moved to Corwin, Ohio, in 1859 and engaged in the mercantile, grain shipping, and pork-packing businesses.
During the Civil War served in the Union Army as captain of Company D, One Hundred and Eightieth Regiment, Ohio Volunteers, until the close of the war.
He moved to Chicago, Illinois.
He engaged in lake shipping 1866–1869, and later in the real estate business.
He served as warden of the Cook County Hospital 1877–1881.
He served as an alderman on the Chicago city council from 1889 to 1893.

Mills was elected as a Republican to the Fifty-fifth Congress (March 4, 1897 – March 3, 1899).
He was an unsuccessful candidate for reelection in 1898 to the Fifty-sixth Congress.
He resumed the real estate business.
He died in Chicago, Illinois, on December 16, 1904.
He was interred in Graceland Cemetery.

References

1838 births
1904 deaths
Burials at Graceland Cemetery (Chicago)
Union Army officers
Chicago City Council members
Republican Party members of the United States House of Representatives from Illinois
19th-century American politicians
People from Waynesville, Ohio
Military personnel from Illinois